A welder is a tradesperson who specializes in fusing materials together.

Welder may also refer to:

Arts and entertainment
 Welder (album), a 2010 album by Elizabeth Cook
 The Welder, a 2021 American horror film

People
 Welder (footballer) (b. 1969), a former Brazilian football player
 Weldinho, or Welder da Silva Marçal, a Brazilian football player
 Welder Knaf (b. 1981), a Brazilian para table tennis player
 Thomas Welder (1940–2020), an American educator and nun

Other uses
 Welding power supply, a machine used to power arc welding procedures
 Welder Wildlife Foundation, a wildlife foundation in Texas